Kiszkurno is a Polish surname. Notable people with the surname include:

Józef Kiszkurno (1895–1981), Polish sport shooter
Zygmunt Kiszkurno (1921–2012), Polish sport shooter, son of Józef

Polish-language surnames